Michael Kessler (born 24 June 1967) is a German actor, comedian and author.

Career

Theater 
Kessler had his acting training at the Westfälische Schauspielschule Bochum from 1988 to 1992. Afterwards he began acting roles at Schauspielhaus Bochum, Schauspiel Frankfurt, Nationaltheater Mannheim and Schauspielhaus Zürich. Since 2005, he has starred alongside Christoph Maria Herbst, Bastian Pastewka, and Jürgen Tonkel in the play Männerhort at the Theater am Kurfürstendamm theater in Berlin.

Film 
In 2006, he starred in Hui Buh – Das Schlossgespenst. In 2015, he starred in Schmidts Katze.

Short movies 
In 2002, he had a starring role in the acclaimed film Zwei Wochen Argentinien ("Two Weeks in Argentina"). Later in 2003, he took part in Glückstag ("Lucky Day") and Für gutes Betragen ("For Good Behaviour").

Television 

Kessler has been working for television since 1992. Among the productions he participated are Siebenbirken, Schwarz greift ein, Das Schicksal der Woche, Hotel Mama 1-3, Sonntags geöffnet, The Last Courier, Sophie, Callboy, Kommissare Südwest, St. Angela, Ein Fall für zwei, Großstadtrevier, Tatort, Der kleine Mönch, SK Kölsch, Das Leben der Philosophen, and Cologne P.D.

He has starred in the comedy series Kesslers Knigge.

Comedy 
From 1999 to 2000, Kessler was a cast member of Switch. From 2001 to 2002, he was part of the Wochenshow cast. Afterwards, he appeared on Axel!, Urmel aus dem Eis, Ladyland, and Pastewka. He became a regular on Schillerstraße since its first episode in 2004. Additionally, he took part in the game show Genial daneben and in ProSieben Märchenstunde ("ProSieben Fairy Tale Hour") in the episodes Rotkäppchen ("Little Red Riding Hood"), Froschkönig ("The Frog Prince") and Aschenputtel ("Cinderella").

Since October 2006, Kessler became the driver and host of RBB Fernsehen's Berliner Nacht Taxe ("Berlin Night Taxi"). "I want to have the unaltered stories of the night", he stated. "We're going to meet authentic people. That's no talk theater with cast actors." The series with six episodes was first broadcast on 30 October 2006 and aired every fortnight. 

In 2007 and 2008, he became the cast member of the Switch Reloaded and started working on his own TV show.

Voice acting
Kessler has had a couple of voice acting roles. These are Rattlesnake Jake in Rango and Hackus in The Smurfs 2.

References

External links 
 Michael Kessler's official website
 
 Michael Kessler's official YouTube channel

1967 births
Living people
German male film actors
German male stage actors
German male television actors
German male comedians
People from Wiesbaden
German male writers
ARD (broadcaster) people
ProSieben people